Josh Winder (born October 11, 1996) is an American professional baseball pitcher for the Minnesota Twins of Major League Baseball (MLB).

High school and college
Winder attended James River High School in Midlothian, Virginia and played college baseball at the Virginia Military Institute.

Professional career
He was drafted by the Minnesota Twins in the seventh round of the 2018 Major League Baseball draft.

Winder made his professional debut with the Elizabethton Twins and played 2019 with the Cedar Rapids Kernels. He did not play a minor league game in 2020 since the season was cancelled due to the COVID-19 pandemic. Winder started 2021 with the Wichita Wind Surge and was promoted to the St. Paul Saints during the season. In June 2021, Winder was selected to play in the All-Star Futures Game. Over 14 starts between the two teams, Winder went 4–0 with a 2.63 ERA and 80 strikeouts over 72 innings. Winder was selected to the 40-man roster following the season on November 19, 2021.

References

External links

1996 births
Living people
Baseball players from Richmond, Virginia
Major League Baseball pitchers
Minnesota Twins players
VMI Keydets baseball players
Elizabethton Twins players
Cedar Rapids Kernels players
Wichita Wind Surge players
St. Paul Saints players